The Pedernales Municipality is one of the four municipalities (municipios) that makes up the eastern Venezuelan state of Delta Amacuro and, according to a 2007 population estimate by the National Institute of Statistics of Venezuela, the municipality has a population of 6,535.  The town of Pedernales is the municipal seat of the Pedernales Municipality.

History
The Pedernales District became the Pedernales Municipality in 1994.

Demographics
The Pedernales Municipality, according to a 2007 population estimate by the National Institute of Statistics of Venezuela, has a population of 6,535 (up from 5,181 in 2000). This amounts to 4.2% of the state's population.

Government
The mayor of the Pedernales Municipality is Selgio Buanerges Ramírez, elected on October 31, 2004, with 40% of the vote.   He replaced Cristobal Jimenez shortly after the elections.  The municipality is divided into two parishes; Pedernales and Luis Beltrán Prieto Figueroa (previous to February 25, 1995, the Pedernales Municipality contained only a single parish).

References

Municipalities of Delta Amacuro